DXIM (93.5 FM) Hope Radio is a radio station owned and operated by Adventist Media. The station's studio and transmitter are located at KM 3, Ba-an Hi-way, Butuan. It was formerly broadcast on 1323 kHz AM from 2012 until 2016, when it moved to the FM band.

References

Radio stations in Butuan
Radio stations established in 2012